DNA-directed RNA polymerase II subunit RPB11-a is an enzyme that in humans is encoded by the POLR2J gene.

Function 

This gene encodes a subunit of RNA polymerase II, the polymerase responsible for synthesizing messenger RNA in eukaryotes. The product of this gene exists as a heterodimer with another polymerase subunit; together they form a core subassembly unit of the polymerase. Two similar genes are located nearby on chromosome 7q22.1 and a pseudogene is found on chromosome 7p13.

Interactions 

POLR2J has been shown to interact with:
 Apoptosis antagonizing transcription factor,
 POLR2C,  and
 SATB1.

References

Further reading